The 2001 Sportingbet.com Premier League was a professional non-ranking snooker tournament that was played from 6 January to 13 May 2001. The highest break of the tournament was 143 made by Marco Fu against Stephen Hendry on 25 March 2001.

Ronnie O'Sullivan won in the final 9–7 against Hendry.


League phase

Top four qualified for the play-offs. If points were level then most frames won determined their positions. If two players had an identical record then the result in their match determined their positions. If that ended 4–4 then the player who got to four first was higher.

 6 January – Brangwyn Hall, Swansea, Wales
 Marco Fu 5–3 Mark Williams
 Ronnie O'Sullivan 7–1 Steve Davis
 Stephen Hendry 4–4 Jimmy White
 7 January – Brangwyn Hall, Swansea, Wales
 Marco Fu 6–2 Jimmy White
 Stephen Hendry 6–2 Steve Davis
 Mark Williams 4–4 John Higgins
 2 February – Woodford Leisure Centre, Hull, England
 Marco Fu 5–3 Steve Davis
 Ronnie O'Sullivan 6–2 Stephen Hendry
 3 February – Woodford Leisure Centre, Hull, England
 Marco Fu 5–3 Ronnie O'Sullivan
 Mark Williams 6–2 Steve Davis
 John Higgins 5–3 Jimmy White
 17 February – Kingsway Leisure Centre, Widnes, England
 Steve Davis 5–3 Jimmy White
 John Higgins 6–2 Marco Fu
 Mark Williams 4–4 Ronnie O'Sullivan
 18 February – Kingsway Leisure Centre, Widnes, England
 Stephen Hendry 6–2 Mark Williams
 John Higgins 4–4 Ronnie O'Sullivan
 24 March – Rothwell Sports Centre, Leeds, England
 Ronnie O'Sullivan 6–2 Jimmy White
 Stephen Hendry 5–3 John Higgins
 25 March – Rothwell Sports Centre, Leeds, England
 John Higgins 5–3 Steve Davis
 Marco Fu 5–3 Stephen Hendry
 Mark Williams 7–1 Jimmy White

Play-offs 
10–11 May – Inverness Leisure Centre, Inverness, Scotland

References

2001
Premier League
Premier League Snooker